Avenir Sportif de La Marsa or ASM is a football club from La Marsa in Tunisia. Founded in 1939, the team plays in green and yellow colours. Their ground is Stade Abdelaziz Chtioui, which has a capacity of 6,000. When the club was founded its name was Club Musulman (Muslim Club).

Achievements

Performance in national & domestic competitions
 Tunisian President Cup: 5
 Winners : 1961, 1977, 1984, 1990, 1994
 Runners-up : 1965, 1966, 1973, 1983, 1987, 1993, 2013
 Tunisian League Cup: 1
 Winners : 2007
 Coupe Hédi Chaker 
 Runners-up : 1961

Performance in CAF competitions
CAF Confederation Cup: 1 appearance
2005 – Group stage (Top 8)

CAF Cup Winners' Cup: 3 appearances
1985 – First round
1991 – Second round
1995 – Withdrew in Quarter-finals

Performance in arab competitions
Arab Cup Winners' Cup: 2 appearances
1992 – Semi-finals
1994 – Semi-finals

Colours & badges

AS Marsa supporters help is needed to develop this section.

Players

Current squad

Former personnel

Coaches

1959–60 :  Rachid Turki
1960–65 :  Sandor Pazmandy
1965–66 :  Hmid Dhib
1966–67 :  Béji Bouachir and  Taoufik Ben Othman
1967–68 :  Skander Medelgi
1968–69 :  Stanislav Stanković
1969–70 :  Stanislav Stanković then  Taoufik Ben Othman
1970–71 :  Taoufik Ben Othman
1971–72 :  Ahmed Benelfoul
1972–73 :  Omar Gadhoum
1973–74 :  Omar Gadhoum then  Ali Selmi
1974–75 :  Ali Selmi
1975–77 :  Taoufik Ben Othman
1977–78 :  Baccar Ben Miled then  Taoufik Ben Othman
1978–79 :  Ali Selmi
1979–80 :  Taoufik Ben Othman
1980–81 :  Abdelhamid Kermali
1981–82 :  Rachid Mekhloufi
1982–83 :  Taoufik Ben Othman
1983–84 :  Ali Selmi
1984–85 :  Ali Selmi then  Jean-Claude Larrieu
1985–86 :  Dragan Gugleta
1986–87 :  Dragan Gugleta then  Hédi Kouni
1987–88 :  Aleksandar Kostov
1988–89 :  Taoufik Ben Othman
1989–91 :  Aleksandar Kostov
1991–92 :  Ali Selmi
1992–93 :  Rachid Mekhloufi
1993–94 :  Ali Selmi
1994–95 :  Taoufik Ben Othman
1995–97 :  Habib Mejri
1997–98 :  Kousteck
1998–99 :  Khaled Ben Yahia then  Ali Fergani
1999–00 :  Faouzi Merzouki then  Armand Forcherio then  Serge Devèze
2000–01 :  Serge Devèze then  Baccar Ben Miled then  Taoufik Ben Othman
2001–03 :  Habib Mejri
2003–05 :  Ali Selmi
2005–06 :  Ali Selmi then  Taoufik Ben Othman
2006–07 :  Habib Mejri
2007–08 :  Kais Yaacoubi
8 April 2008–08 :  Mrad Mahjoub
1 July 2008 – 25 Jan 2009 :  Abdelkrim Bira then  Khaled Ben Yahia
2009–Nov 8, 2010 :  Kamel Chebli
9 Nov 2010 – 13 Dec 2010 :  Habib Mejri
14 Dec 2010 – 30 June 2013 :  Gérard Buscher
5 July 2013 – 16 Dec 2013 :  Dragan Cvetković
16 Dec 2013 – 30 June 2014 :  Adel Sellimi
1 July 2014– :  Mondher Kebaier

Presidents

 M'hammed Zaouchi (1939–55)
 Othman Ben Othman (1955–56)
 Belhassen Aouij (1956–57)
 Béji Mestiri (1957–59)
 Chedly Hassouna (1959–64)
 Slim Tlili (1964)
 Ali Kallel (1965–66)
 Chedly Hassouna (1966–68)
 Abdellatif Dahmani (1968–71)
 Ali Bouzaiane (1971–72)
 Mondher Ben Ammar (1972–77)
 Abdellatif Dahmani (1977–78)
 Hédi Mehrezi (1978–79)
 Mondher Ben Ammar (1979–80)
 Hammouda Belkhouja (1980–82)
 Mondher Ben Ammar (1982–85)
 Abderrahman Oueslati (1985–88)
 Hammouda Belkhouja (1988–90)
 Tijani Meddeb (1990–92)
 Mahmoud Azzouz (1992–94)
 Khaled Bach Hamba (1994–96)
 Jalel Gherab (1996–98)
 Manef Mellouli (1998–99)
 Mahmoud Azzouz (1999–01)
 Brahim Riahi (2001–06)
 Mondher Mami (2006–08)
 Montassar Mehrzi (2008–10)
 Hammouda Louzir (2011)
 Maher Ben Aïssa (2011–1?)

See also
AS Marsa (volleyball)
AS Marsa Women's Volleyball

References

External links
Club Profil @ WFA 

Football clubs in Tunisia
Association football clubs established in 1939
1939 establishments in Tunisia
Sports clubs in Tunisia